The Piaroa–Saliban, also known as Saliban (in spanish : Sálivan), are a small proposed language family of the middle Orinoco Basin, which forms an independent island within an area of Venezuela and Colombia (northern llanos) dominated by peoples of Carib and Arawakan affiliation.

Betoi may be related.

Languages
Piaroa and Wirö (or "Maco") form a Piaroan branch of the family.

The extinct Ature language, once spoken on the Orinoco River near the waterfalls of Atures, Venezuela, is unattested but was said to be 'little different' from Saliba, and so may have formed a Saliban branch of the family.

Language contact
Jolkesky (2016) notes that there are lexical similarities with the Andoke–Urekena, Arawak, Máku, Tukano, and Yaruro language families due to contact.

Lozano (2014:212) has also noted similarities between the Saliba-Hodi and Arawakan languages.

External relations
Zamponi (2017) notes resemblances between the extinct Betoi language and Piaroa–Saliban. He considers a genealogical relationship plausible, though data on Betoi is scarce.

There are lexical similarities with the Hotï language (Jodï), and this has been interpreted as evidence for a Jodï–Saliban language family. However, the similarities have also been explained as contact.

Jolkesky (2009) includes Piaroa-Saliba, Betoi and Hodi in a Duho family along with Ticuna–Yuri.

Vocabulary
Loukotka (1968) lists the following basic vocabulary items for the Piaroa–Saliban languages.

{| class="wikitable sortable"
! gloss !! Piaroa !! Maco !! Saliva
|-
! one
| yauotenéte || niareti || sinote
|-
! two
| tonerima || tagus || toxera
|-
! three
| wabodexkuána || perkotahuya || kenxuapadi
|-
! head
| tsú ||  || yio
|-
! eye
| chiere ||  || pakuté
|-
! tooth
| tsaxká ||  || oayá
|-
! man
| uba ||  || umbei
|-
! water
| ahiya || ahia || kagua
|-
! fire
| uxkude ||  || egusta
|-
! sun
| morho || gama || numeseki
|-
! maize
| ñamo || imó || yamo
|-
! jaguar
| ñáwi ||  || impué
|}

Rosés Labrada (2019) lists the following Swadesh-list items that are reconstructable to Proto-Sáliban.

{| class="wikitable sortable"
! no. !! gloss !! Sáliba !! Piaroa !! Mako
|-
| 13 || bite (v) || ɲĩpe || j̃ɨ || ʤ̃ɨbɨ
|-
| 15 || blood || kʷau || ʧukʷɤha || ʧukʷi iʦobu
|-
| 22 || cold || dia || dijɑwɑʔɑ || tiʤua
|-
| 31 || drink (v) || õgʷe || ɑwu || owɨ
|-
| 36 || soil || sẽxẽ || ɾẽhẽ || nihi
|-
| 37 || eat (v) || ikʷe || ku || kuanɨ
|-
| 38 || egg || hiea || ijæ || iʤapo
|-
| 39 || eye || pahute || ʧiʔæhæɾe || ʧɨbahale
|-
| 41 || far || oto || ɤtɤ || ɨdɨ
|-
| 42 || fat/oil || õdete || ɑ̃dẽ || õte
|-
| 49 || fish || pahĩdi || pɤĩ || bãĩ
|-
| 53 || flower || sebapu || æʔu || ĩʦãbũ
|-
| 66 || hand || umo || ʧũmu || ʧɨmamu
|-
| 70 || heart || omaidi || ʧɑ̃mi isɤkˀi || ʧomahade
|-
| 71 || heavy || umaga || ɑmækɑʔɑ || ɨmɨka
|-
| 96 || meat || dea || ʧidepæ || itebia
|-
| 99 || mouth || aha || ʧæ || ʧaa
|-
| 106 || nose || ĩxu || ʧ̃ɨhĩjũ || ʧĩʤũ
|-
| 116 || red/yellow || dua || tũɑ̃ʔɑ̃ || duwɨ
|-
| 119 || river || oxe || ɑhe || ohʷe
|-
| 120 || path || maana || mænæ || mana/mãlã
|-
| 138 || sky || mũma sẽxẽ || moɾɤ̃hæ̃ || m̃ɨlẽhẽ
|-
| 139 || sleep (v) || ae || æʔɨ || abɨ
|-
| 144 || snake || ɟakʷi || ækɑ || akoˀda
|-
| 152 || star || sipodi || siɾikˀɤ || ʦiɾiʔi
|-
| 158 || swell (v) || hipame || hiæmɑʔɑ || hebamɨ
|-
| 172 || tongue || anane || ʧine || ʧinene
|-
| 176 || two (anim) || tuxũdu || tɑ̃hũ || dũhũtaha
|-
| 179 || hot || duda || duɑʔɑ || tuba
|-
| 184 || what? || ãdaha || dæhe || tahi
|-
| 187 || white || dea || teɑʔɑ || dewɨ
|-
| 188 || who? || ãdiha || di || ti
|-
| 195 || woman || ɲaxu || isahu || iʦuhu
|}

See also
Duho languages

References

Bibliography
 Benaissa, T. (1991). Vocabulario Sáliba-Español Español Sáliba. Lomalinda: Alberto Lleras Camargo.
 Feddema, H. (1991). Diccionario Piaroa - Español. (Manuscript).
 Krute, L. D. (1989). Piaroa nominal morphosemantics. New York: Columbia University. (Doctoral dissertation).
 Kaufman, Terrence. (1990). Language history in South America: What we know and how to know more. In D. L. Payne (Ed.), Amazonian linguistics: Studies in lowland South American languages (pp. 13–67). Austin: University of Texas Press. .
 Kaufman, Terrence. (1994). The native languages of South America. In C. Mosley & R. E. Asher (Eds.), Atlas of the world's languages (pp. 46–76). London: Routledge.

External links
 Sáliba wordlist in Spanish & English
 PROEL: Familia Piaroa–Saliva

 
Jodi–Saliban languages